WWE Stomping Grounds was a professional wrestling pay-per-view (PPV) and livestreaming event produced by WWE. It was held for wrestlers from the promotion's Raw, SmackDown, and 205 Live brand divisions. The event took place on June 23, 2019, at the Tacoma Dome in Tacoma, Washington. It was a one-off event that replaced Backlash for 2019 as Backlash was reinstated in 2020.

Nine matches were contested at the event, including one on the Kickoff pre-show. In the main event, Seth Rollins defeated Baron Corbin in a no countout, no disqualification match to retain Raw's Universal Championship with Lacey Evans as the special guest referee. In other prominent matches, Kofi Kingston defeated Dolph Ziggler in a steel cage match to retain SmackDown's WWE Championship, Ricochet defeated Samoa Joe to win Raw's United States Championship, and Roman Reigns defeated Drew McIntyre.

Production

Background
WWE's established event Backlash was originally scheduled to be held on June 16, 2019, in San Diego, California. On April 29, however, it was announced that Backlash had been canceled and would instead be a house show while a pay-per-view (PPV) and livestreaming event titled Stomping Grounds would instead be held on June 23, 2019, at the Tacoma Dome in Tacoma, Washington. Stomping Grounds featured wrestlers from the Raw, SmackDown, and 205 Live brand divisions. Tacoma Dome was the site of World Championship Wrestling (WCW)'s Spring Stampede PPV in 1999 and the failed WCW re-launch that occurred on July 2, 2001 broadcast of Raw is War between Booker T and Buff Bagwell for the WCW World Heavyweight Championship.

Storylines
The show comprised nine matches, including one on the Kickoff pre-show, that resulted from scripted storylines, where wrestlers portrayed heroes, villains, or less distinguishable characters in scripted events that built tension and culminated in a wrestling match or series of matches. Results were predetermined by WWE's writers on the Raw, SmackDown, and 205 Live brands, while storylines were produced on WWE's weekly television shows, Monday Night Raw, SmackDown Live, and the cruiserweight-exclusive 205 Live.

During Seth Rollins' Universal Championship defense against Baron Corbin at Super ShowDown, Corbin got into an argument with referee John Cone, allowing Rollins to roll-up Corbin to retain the title. After the match, Corbin attacked Rollins with the "End of Days" and a title rematch was scheduled for Stomping Grounds. On the following Raw, Corbin revealed that he was able to convince WWE officials to allow him to choose a special guest referee for their rematch, since he felt that it was Cone's fault for him losing at Super ShowDown. Corbin was going to choose Elias, but he was attacked by Rollins, who followed suit and continued to attack Corbin's other potential choices: EC3 and Eric Young on Raw, and The B-Team (Curtis Axel and Bo Dallas) on SmackDown. Corbin's decision on the special guest referee remained unknown before Stomping Grounds.

At Money in the Bank, Bayley won the women's Money in the Bank ladder match and later that night cashed in the contract on Charlotte Flair to win the SmackDown Women's Championship. On the June 4 episode of SmackDown, Flair competed in a triple threat match against Carmella and Raw's Alexa Bliss, who appeared via the wild card rule, in order to earn a rematch against Bayley for the title at Stomping Grounds. Bliss, however, won the match, thus Bliss earned the title match.

At WrestleMania 35, Roman Reigns defeated Drew McIntyre. Reigns was then drafted to SmackDown in the Superstar Shake-up, while McIntyre joined forces with Shane McMahon, but lost another match to Reigns by disqualification when Reigns appeared on the May 6 episode of Raw via the wild card rule. At Super ShowDown, Shane defeated Reigns thanks to a Claymore from McIntyre while the referee was incapacitated. Afterwards, another match between Reigns and McIntyre was scheduled for Stomping Grounds.

At Money in the Bank, Becky Lynch retained the Raw Women's Championship against Lacey Evans, who in turn caused Lynch to lose her SmackDown Women's Championship to Charlotte Flair that same night. After more feuding on Raw, another match between Lynch and Evans for the Raw Women's Championship was scheduled for Stomping Grounds.

At Super ShowDown, Kofi Kingston defeated Dolph Ziggler to retain the WWE Championship thanks to interference from fellow New Day member Xavier Woods. Following the match, an irate Ziggler claimed he would have beaten Kingston had it not been for Woods and then challenged Kingston to a Steel Cage match for the title at Stomping Grounds and Kingston accepted.

On the June 11 episode of SmackDown, The New Day (Big E, Kofi Kingston, and Xavier Woods) defeated the team of Dolph Ziggler, Kevin Owens, and Sami Zayn, the latter appearing via the wild card rule. On the following Raw, wild card guests The New Day defeated the team of Owens (also appearing via the wild card rule), Zayn, and Baron Corbin in a two out of three falls match. A tag team match between New Day's Big E and Woods against Owens and Zayn was then scheduled for Stomping Grounds.

On the June 11 episode of 205 Live, a fatal four-way match between Drew Gulak, Humberto Carrillo, Oney Lorcan, and Akira Tozawa occurred to determine the number one contender against Tony Nese for the WWE Cruiserweight Championship on the Stomping Grounds Kickoff pre-show. The match, however, ended with both Gulak and Tozawa scoring a double pin. The following week, 205 Live General Manager Drake Maverick decided that Nese would defend the title against both Gulak and Tozawa in a triple threat match.

On the June 10 episode of Raw, United States Champion Samoa Joe was a guest on The Miz's "Miz TV", only to get interrupted by Braun Strowman, Bobby Lashley, Ricochet, and Cesaro, each stating a claim to challenge Joe for his title. The following week, a fatal five-way elimination match between Strowman, Lashley, Ricochet, Cesaro, and Miz occurred to determine Joe's challenger for the title at Stomping Grounds, which was won by Ricochet.

After SmackDown Tag Team Champions Daniel Bryan and Rowan berated the SmackDown tag team division on the May 28 episode of SmackDown, Heavy Machinery (Otis and Tucker) interrupted and challenged the champions to a title match, which was accepted but for a later time. On the June 11 episode, Bryan and Rowan were set to have a title unification match with the kayfabe Yolo County Tag Team Champions, a couple of "local" wrestlers with cardboard belts. Heavy Machinery came out before the match and accused Bryan and Rowan of avoiding their challenge. Bryan said that Heavy Machinery needed to earn the opportunity and had them instead face the enhancement talent, who Heavy Machinery quickly defeated. Bryan and Rowan were then scheduled to defend the SmackDown Tag Team Championship against Heavy Machinery at Stomping Grounds.

Event

Pre-show 
During the Stomping Grounds Kickoff pre-show, Tony Nese defended the WWE Cruiserweight Championship against Drew Gulak and Akira Tozawa. In the climax, after Nese was pushed out of the ring, Gulak performed an Argentine neckbreaker on Tozawa to win the title.

Preliminary matches 
The actual pay-per-view opened with Becky Lynch defending the Raw Women's Championship against Lacey Evans. In the end, Lynch forced Evans to submit to the "Dis-Arm-Her" to retain the title.

Next, Kevin Owens and Sami Zayn faced The New Day (Big E and Xavier Woods). In the end, Owens performed a stunner on Woods to win the match.

After that, Samoa Joe defended the United States Championship against Ricochet. The end came when Ricochet performed a Recoil and a 630° senton on Joe to win the title. Immediately after the match, Ricochet was congratulated backstage by Seth Rollins, Curt Hawkins, Zack Ryder, Carmella, Charlotte Flair, Heavy Machinery (Otis and Tucker), and WWE Chief Operating Officer Triple H.

In the fourth match, Daniel Bryan and Rowan defended the SmackDown Tag Team Championship against Heavy Machinery (Otis and Tucker). In the end, Tucker performed a cross-body on Rowan on the outside of the ring. Bryan then pinned Tucker with a small package to retain the titles.

Next, Bayley defended the SmackDown Women's Championship against Raw's Alexa Bliss (who was accompanied by Nikki Cross). During the match, Bayley performed a suicide dive on Cross. In the end, Cross inadvertently distracted Bliss. Bliss attempted "Twisted Bliss", however, Bayley countered by raising her knees. Bayley performed a "Bayley-to-Belly Suplex" on Bliss to retain the title.

After that, Roman Reigns faced Drew McIntyre (accompanied by Shane McMahon). During the match, Shane attempted to distract Reigns on numerous occasions. Reigns performed a Spear on McIntyre only for Shane to pull the referee out of the ring during a pinfall attempt. Shane performed a Coast-to-Coast on Reigns and McIntyre scored a near-fall. In the end, as McIntyre attempted a "Claymore", Reigns countered with a superman punch and performed a spear to win the match.

In the penultimate match, The New Day's Kofi Kingston defended the WWE Championship against Dolph Ziggler in a Steel Cage match. In the end, as Ziggler was attempting to crawl out of the cage door, Kingston jumped over Ziggler and through the door to escape the cage first to retain the title.

Main event 
In the main event, Seth Rollins defended the Universal Championship against Baron Corbin, who revealed the special guest referee to be Lacey Evans. Throughout the match, Evans favored Corbin as a way to redeem herself from her loss earlier in the night against Becky Lynch, Rollins' real-life girlfriend. After Rollins performed a powerbomb on Corbin through the English announcers' table, Evans counted up to 9 before changing the stipulation of the match to a No Countout match. Corbin then attacked Rollins with a steel chair that Rollins brought earlier. Rather than disqualifying Corbin, Evans added that the match was now also a No Disqualification match. Corbin attempted to perform a DDT on Rollins on the steel chair, only for Rollins to counter and performed a "Falcon Arrow" to Corbin onto the steel chair. Rollins attempted a pin on Corbin only for Evans to refuse. An irate Rollins turned his attention to Evans, who slapped and performed a low-blow on him, allowing Corbin to perform the "End of Days" on Rollins. Before Evans could count the pin, however, Lynch ran out and brawled with Evans. Referees emerged and separated Lynch and Evans, one of them being John Cone, who in turn replaced Evans as referee, much to Corbin's dismay. In the climax, as Corbin attempted another "End of Days", Rollins countered into a superkick and followed up with "The Stomp" to retain the title.

Reception 
The event received mostly positive critical reactions. Jason Powell of Pro Wrestling Dot Net described Stomping Grounds as a "straight forward show" that ended in a "polarizing" main event. Though the "wrestlers worked hard", the show featured "bad title feuds" that Powell wished would end. The main event angle was judged more worthy of a Raw than a pay-per-view, Kingston-Ziggler "suffered from it being so difficult to believe that Ziggler was a threat", and  Reigns-McIntyre was "very good", but McIntyre "still seems like he's just another guy they are feeding to Reigns rather than someone they have a real plan for". Also, "WWE has been labeling Ricochet as a sensation and this win is the first time they've actually made him feel like it."

Erik Beaston of Bleacher Report praised the event, giving the Rollins-Corbin match the highest grading of A+, quoting "This was an outstanding example of the theatricality of professional wrestling and a throwback to an era when storytelling was as integral a part of any given match as the ring work itself", and the SmackDown Tag Team Title Match and the New Day vs. Kevin Owens and Sami Zayn both received the second-highest grade of A. The Raw Women's Championship Match received the lowest grading of C, quoting "This was a match in which it never felt like the competitors were on the same page. The action was disjointed, the psychology wonky at times and the finish came from out of nowhere."

The event received 11,000 pay-per-view purchases, but live attendance was one of the lowest of WWE's PPV history

Aftermath 
Stomping Grounds would be a one-off event for WWE, as Backlash was reinstated for June the following year.

Raw 
The following night on Raw, a brawl broke out between Universal Champion Seth Rollins, Raw Women's Champion Becky Lynch, Baron Corbin, and Lacey Evans. This led to a last chance winners take all mixed tag team extreme rules match for both the Universal and Raw Women's championships being scheduled for Extreme Rules.

Roman Reigns faced Shane McMahon and Drew McIntyre in a handicap match. Shane and McIntyre dominated Reigns until The Undertaker came to his aid, setting up a no holds barred tag team match at Extreme Rules.

SmackDown 
On SmackDown, Dolph Ziggler faced WWE Champion Kofi Kingston in a two out of three falls match in order to be inserted into the championship match at Extreme Rules, but was unsuccessful.

Nikki Cross apologized to Alexa Bliss, feeling that it was her fault that Bliss lost. On SmackDown, wild card guest Cross defeated Bayley to earn Bliss a rematch for the SmackDown Women's Championship at Extreme Rules.

Heavy Machinery (Otis and Tucker) earned another opportunity for the SmackDown Tag Team Championship at Extreme Rules by defeating the team of Kevin Owens and Dolph Ziggler.

205 Live 
On 205 Live, Tony Nese defeated Akira Tozawa to earn a rematch against Drew Gulak for the WWE Cruiserweight Championship at Extreme Rules.

Results

References

External links

Stomping Ground
Stomping Ground
2019 in Washington (state)
Professional wrestling in Washington (state)
Events in Washington (state)
June 2019 events in the United States